Celebrity Eye Candy is a television series on VH1 that first aired on December 15, 2005. It features photos and videos of celebrities taken by the paparazzi within the past week. Frequently the celebrities were shown in a poor light. The host of the show is never seen and is a voice-over only. He often opens the show with a somewhat humorous song about the video that was presented over the course of the show. In addition, the host normally sings a few songs about celebrities doing something normal things, such as scratching an itch or grocery shopping.

The show initially aired weekly episodes for approximately 4 months but with mediocre ratings. It was put on hiatus in July 2006. It returned in February 2007, albeit on a more sporadic airing basis.

External links
 
 

VH1 original programming
Infotainment
2000s American reality television series
2005 American television series debuts
English-language television shows